Kaoh Pong Satv is a khum (commune) of Serei Saophoan District in Banteay Meanchey Province in north-western Cambodia.

Villages

Kaoh Pong Satv(កោះពងសត្វ)
Ta Sokh(តាសុក)
Preah Angk(ព្រះអង្គ)
Snay Dangkot(ស្នាយដង្គត់)
Angkea Bos(អង្គារបុស្ស)

References

Communes of Banteay Meanchey province
Serei Saophoan District